Is There Anybody Out There? The Wall Live 1980–81 is a live album released by Pink Floyd in 2000. It is a live rendition of The Wall, produced and engineered by James Guthrie, with tracks selected from the August 1980 and June 1981 performances at Earls Court in London. The album was first released in The Netherlands by EMI Records on 23 March 2000, who released a limited edition in the United Kingdom on 27 March. The general release followed on 18 April 2000 with US and Canadian distribution by Columbia Records.

The shows involved the construction of a wall on stage throughout the first half of the show. Once complete, members of the band performed in small openings in, atop, in front of, or even behind the wall.  The album artwork featured the life-masks of the four band members in front of a black wall; the masks were worn by the "surrogate band" during the song "In the Flesh".  "Goodbye Blue Sky" and parts of "Run Like Hell" were taken from the 17 June 1981 show, the very last performance by the four-man Pink Floyd until the 2005 Live 8 concert.

The album was re-released in February 2012 in remastered form as part of the "Immersion" boxset edition of The Wall.

Background
Is There Anybody Out There? contains live versions of all the original songs along with two additional songs: "What Shall We Do Now?" and "The Last Few Bricks".  "What Shall We Do Now?" was planned for the original album but removed just before release. (It remained on the lyric sheet for the original LP, but excised from future CD re-releases.)  "The Last Few Bricks" was an instrumental bridge between "Another Brick in the Wall (Part III)" and "Goodbye Cruel World", and contained themes from "The Happiest Days of Our Lives", "Don't Leave Me Now", "Young Lust", "Empty Spaces" and "What Shall We Do Now?", all transposed to D minor. It was played to allow the bricklayers to almost completely seal off the stage before Roger Waters appeared in the last brick-wide space in the wall to sing "Goodbye Cruel World", ending the first set of the show. This music never had an official title before the release of the live album. Fans named the track "Almost Gone" on some bootleg albums of the shows, but the official name was suggested by producer James Guthrie during the mixing of the live album. The album also contained two spoken tracks titled "MC: Atmos" ("Master of Ceremonies" for the first North American release), which served as introductions to the songs "In the Flesh?" and "In the Flesh", respectively. These were performed by Gary Yudman, MC for the Earls Court and Nassau Coliseum shows. The second version was a section of a recording of his speech from the first version, played at slower speed to parody the frustration ("The band is about ready to begin, I think ... No, not quite yet") of waiting for the band to start.

The tracks differed slightly from the studio album, primarily in terms of longer intros and extended solos. Due to the constraints of vinyl records, the band had been forced to severely edit many songs for the album, removing whole sections, many of which were restored in concert. For example, "The Show Must Go On" had an extra verse that was deleted from the original studio recording (but included in the lyric sheet, even on the latest CD releases.) "Outside the Wall" was longer and re-arranged with mandolin, accordion, clarinet, acoustic guitars, tambourines and more natural-sounding vocal harmonies from the quartet of Joe Chemay, Jim Farber, Jim Haas, and Jon Joyce.  (This would be the third official version of "Outside the Wall" available to the listener, following the extended orchestral version from the 1982 film.)

During the tour, Richard Wright performed as a salaried musician rather than a full member, having been fired by Waters during the sessions for the original album. The four Pink Floyd members were duplicated by the "surrogate band".

The album was released to commemorate The Wall album and concerts' 20th anniversary.

Is There Anybody Out There? was re-issued in the US and Canada in July 2005, remastered by James Guthrie, Joel Plante and Kim Richards. The booklet features some songwriting updates and mentions that the MC: Atmos on disc one used a sample of "We'll Meet Again" by Vera Lynn.

Track listing

Personnel
Pink Floyd
David Gilmour – electric guitar and acoustic guitars, vocals, mandolin on "Outside the Wall", musical director
Roger Waters – vocals, bass guitar, acoustic guitar on "Mother", clarinet on "Outside the Wall"
Nick Mason – drums, percussion, acoustic guitar on "Outside the Wall"
Richard Wright – piano, organ, synthesizer, accordion on "Outside the Wall" (During the tour, Wright was no longer part of the band, but hired as a session musician. Despite this, he was listed as a band member in the tour program and the album credits)

Additional personnel

Peter Wood – keyboards, acoustic guitar on "Outside the Wall"
Snowy White – guitars (1980 shows)
Andy Roberts – guitars (1981 shows)
Andy Bown – bass guitar, acoustic guitar on "Outside the Wall"
Willie Wilson – drums, percussion (Except for the 14 June 1981 Show)
Clive Brooks – drums, percussion (14 June 1981 Show)  
Joe Chemay – backing vocals
Stan Farber – backing vocals
Jim Haas – backing vocals
Jon Joyce – backing vocals
Gary Yudman – MC

Charts and certifications

Certifications

References

External links 
- Site containing transcripts of Waters' speeches before Run Like Hell

Albums produced by James Guthrie (record producer)
Albums with cover art by Storm Thorgerson
The Wall (rock opera)
Pink Floyd live albums
2000 live albums
Columbia Records live albums
EMI Records live albums